This is the list of the 21 members of the European Parliament for Austria in the 1999 to 2004 session.

List

Notes

Austria
List
1999